The Ruwanpura Expressway, also known as the Ratnapura Expressway will be Sri Lanka's sixth E Class highway. The  highway will link the Kahathuduwa exit on the Southern Expressway with Pelmadulla, a major city in Sabaragamuwa Province, Sri Lanka, via Ratnapura, the provincial capital of Sabargamuwa Province. 

In 2014 President Mahinda Rajapaksa's government proposed and granted approval for the project. It was initially proposed to commence construction in 2014 and to be completed in 2019.

Construction of the highway was then proposed to commence in January 2017 and be built in three stages. The construction contract was awarded to a Chinese Company. The expressway was then proposed to be completed by 2019.  But constructions were not started.

In 2020, newly elected government cancelled the contract to the Chinese firm and started the construction works of 1st phase 26 kilometre section at a cost of 54.7 billion rupees with domestic finance. Contract was awarded to Sri Lanka-based Maga Constructions.

See also

References

Highways in Sri Lanka